"You I Know" is a song by New Zealand musician Jenny Morris. It was released in July 1987 as the third single from her debut studio album, Body and Soul (1987).

Track listings
 CD Single/ 7"  (WEA – 0-258299)
 "You I Know" – 4:10
 "Broke the Leather" – 4:29

Charts

Weekly charts

Year-end charts

References

1987 songs
1987 singles
Jenny Morris (musician) songs
Songs written by Neil Finn